Otha William Bill Bailey (born June 30, 1931 – September 17, 2013) was an American Negro league baseball player. He was a catcher for many teams. He played for the Birmingham Black Barons, Chattanooga Choo-Choos, Cleveland Buckeyes, Houston Eagles, and the New Orleans Eagles from 1949 to 1959. Throughout his career, his nickname was "Little Catch".

He was born in Huntsville, Alabama and died in Birmingham, Alabama.

References

External links
 
 

1931 births
2013 deaths
Baseball players from Birmingham, Alabama
Birmingham Black Barons players
Cleveland Buckeyes players
Houston Eagles players
New Orleans Eagles players
20th-century African-American sportspeople
21st-century African-American people